Karina Grömer (born 1974) is an Austrian archaeologist known for her contribution to the study of archaeological textiles. She is the vice-head of the Department of Prehistory at the Natural History Museum Vienna in Austria.

Education and career 
Grömer studied prehistoric archaeology, anthropology, history and ethnology at the University of Vienna, Department of Prehistory and Historical Archaeology in Austria. During her studies she was a member of excavation teams in Austria, France, Croatia and Poland, excavating settlements and cemeteries, covering a time-span between Neolithic and Roman Period. She is engaged with studies in material culture, especially Neolithic, Bronze and Iron Age in Central and Eastern Central Europe. In her research methodology, she is working in an interdisciplinary research context to set artefacts into a wider chronological and supra-regional framework. Theoretical approaches used for her studies are about identity, innovation and creativity, functional design theory, visual coding, design concepts, sociological and semiotic studies.

In 2007 she wrote her doctoral thesis about the Bronze Age textile finds from Hallstatt (Bronzezeitliche Gewebefunde aus Hallstatt und die Entwicklung der Textiltechnologie zur Eisenzeit). Since 2008 she has been working for international and interdisciplinary research projects at the Department of Prehistory at the Natural History Museum Vienna. Her current research focuses on the analysis of textiles from graves and salt-mines, covering a time span from 2000 BC to 1000 AD and a geographical area from Central Europe to Iran.

Public outreach 
In November 2020 she won the Austrian Science Slam with the performance "Hallstatt It Girl with Soundeffect".

She teaches at the University of Vienna, Institute for Prehistory and Historical Archaeology, and acts as visiting lecturer at the University Cambridge (GB), University Southampton (GB) and the Mazaryk University Brno (CZ), where she holds lectures about textile archaeology and experimental archaeology.

She is the author of 7 monographs and 8 edited volumes mainly on textile archaeology from the beginnings up to 500 AD and other overview works to Central European Prehistory.

She is the main editor of four archaeological–anthropological periodicals in Austria (Archäologie Österreichs (until 2010); Mitteilungen der Anthropologischen Gesellschaft in Wien, Archäologie Online Hallstatt; Prähistorische Forschungen Online) and member of the editorial board of Annalen des Naturhistorischen Museums Wien Serie A and Archaeological Textiles Review.

International research projects

Selected publications 
 K. Grömer, A. Kern, A. Kroh (2019): Critical Assessment of Media Stations in the Permanent Exhibition of the Natural History Museum Vienna: Prehistory and Palaeontology. In: W. Börner and S. Uhlirz (ed.): Proceedings of the 23rd International Conference on Cultural Heritage and New Technologies 2018. CHNT 23, 2018 (Vienna 2019). ISBN 978-3-200-06576-5. http://www.chnt.at/proceedings-chnt-23/
 K. Grömer and A. Kern (eds.) (2018): Artifacts. Treasures of the Millennia. A Guide through the Prehistoric Collection. Natural History Museum Vienna Exhibition guide. Wien 2018: Verlag des Naturhistorischen Museums.
 K. Grömer (2016): The Art of Prehistoric Textile Making – The development of craft traditions and clothing in Central Europe. Veröffentlichungen der Prähistorischen Abteilung 5, Verlag des Naturhistorischen Museums Wien, Vienna 2016.
 K. Grömer and F. Pritchard (eds.) (2015): Aspects of the Design, Production and Use of Textiles and Clothing from the Bronze Age to the Early Modern Era. NESAT XII. The North European Symposium for Archaeological Textiles, 21st – 24th May 2014 in Hallstatt, Austria. Archaeolingua Main Series 33. Budapest 2015. 
 K. Grömer (2014): Römische Textilien in Noricum und Westpannonien - im Kontext der archäologischen Gewebefunde 2000 v. Chr. - 500 n. Chr. in Österreich. Austria Antiqua,  Graz 2014.
 K. Grömer, A. Kern, H. Reschreiter and H. Rösel-Mautendorfer (Hrsg.) (2013): Textiles from Hallstatt. Weaving culture in Bronze and Iron Age Salt Mines. Archaeolingua 29, Budapest 2013.
 K. Grömer (2010): Prähistorische Textilkunst. Geschichte des Handwerks und der  Kleidung vor den Römern. Veröffentlichungen der Prähistorischen Abteilung 4, Wien 2010.

References

External links 

Living people
1974 births
Austrian women archaeologists
Natural history museums in Austria
University of Vienna